Studio City is a hotel casino resort on the Cotai Strip in Cotai, Macau. The Hollywood studio-themed leisure resort is the first in Asia to integrate television and film production facilities, retail, gaming and hotels. It is majority-owned by Melco Resorts & Entertainment and its subsidiary Studio City International Holdings Limited (SCIHL), Its two towers are connected by the world’s first and highest figure-8 ferris wheel.

History
The project was initially developed without a casino by U.S. investment firms Silver Point Capital LP and Oaktree Capital Management LLC, with a 40 per cent interest through a joint subsidiary, New Cotai Holdings, and Hong Kong entertainment company eSun Holdings Ltd. In June 2011, Melco Crown Entertainment acquired eSun’s 60 per cent controlling interest. Taubman Centers had also been an early investor, originally acquiring a 25 percent interest in The Mall at Studio City, the retail component of Macau Studio City, then exercised its option, withdrawing US$65 million when its 18-month condition contingent on other financing period expired, on 11 August 2009.

The $3.2 billion Studio City officially opened 27 October 2015 on Macau's Cotai Strip, adjacent to the Cotai Lotus Checkpoint Station and directly connected to the Taipa line of Macau Light Rapid Transit.

Melco Crown Entertainment commissioned a $70 million film for the grand opening of Studio City resort. Produced by Brett Ratner, Martin Scorsese directed Robert De Niro and Leonardo DiCaprio in the 15-minute film, The Audition, portraying fictionalized versions of themselves.

In December 2020, Star Tower at Studio City and Altira Macau, along with other Melco Resorts properties, were named among the first hotels in the world to receive Sharecare Health Security certification by Forbes Travel Guide.

Design and Attractions
Inspired by the Golden Age of Hollywood, the cinematic-themed resort comprises a 30,000-square-foot Family Entertainment Center in collaboration with Time Warner Inc. subsidiaries Warner Bros and DC Comics. The entertainment center features DC Comics characters, such as Superman, Wonder Woman and The Flash.

Studio City features an Art Deco design inspired by two asteroids shooting through a Gotham City building. The resort was designed by Goddard Group, a Los Angeles-based entertainment design firm that also designed Galaxy Macau.

The resort's two hotel towers – Star Tower and Celebrity Tower – are connected by the Golden Reel, the world's first and highest figure-8 ferris wheel. Boarding at the hotel's 23rd floor, the wheel features 17 steampunk-themed cabins holding up to 10 passengers each, also designed by the Goddard Group, with hardware manufactured by Liechtenstein's Intamin Amusement Rides. Batman Dark Flight is a 4D flight simulation theatre attraction, along with a 40,000 square foot children's playground, the Warner Brothers Fun Zone.

Facilities include Legend Heroes Park, an immersive tech-based entertainment park (TBE), a 5,000-seat live performance arena, an indoor/outdoor water park, opened in May 2021, indoor and outdoor swimming pools, a fitness centre and meeting rooms. Star Tower is rated 5-star by Forbes Travel Guide and houses several award-winning restaurants, the Zensa Spa and Pacha Macau nightclub, as well as 1,233 gaming machines and about 250 gaming tables. Studio City Event Center hosts concerts and sporting events.

Guests may also view space through giant portal windows at the Cosmos Food Station food court. Restaurants at Studio City include Michelin-starred Pearl Dragon, Bi Ying, Rossi Trattoria and Hide Yamamoto.

Expansion
Currently under construction, Phase 2 of Studio City's expansion will see the addition of two hotel towers housing approximately 900 rooms, additional gaming areas, a cineplex, an indoor/outdoor water park touted as one of the world's largest, and facilities for meetings, incentives, conferences and exhibitions (MICE).

Near the Taipa Grande Natural Park nature reserve, the two hotel towers are designed to be distanced from each other, creating adequate space for bird migration. On 5 May 2021, it was announced that the Macau government had extended the development period under its land concession contract with Studio City to 27 December 2022.

Announced on 28 December 2021, W Macau – Studio City is scheduled to open in December 2022 as part of Phase 2 with 557 guestrooms, including 127 suites.

See also
 Gambling in Macau
 Cotai

References

2015 establishments in Macau
Buildings and structures in Macau
Cotai